John Russell Vincent (20 December 1937 – 18 March 2021) was a British historian and Fellow of Peterhouse, Cambridge.

Early life and education
Vincent was educated at Bedales School and Christ's College, Cambridge.

Academic career
Vincent joined the University of Bristol in 1970 as Professor of Modern History, from 1984 Professor of History, until his retirement in 2002 when he became Emeritus Professor. He subsequently became Visiting Professor at the University of East Anglia.

Journalist
In the 1980s, Vincent was a columnist for The Times and The Sun newspapers; the latter association ended in 1987. Students from the University of Bristol disrupted some of his lectures in 1986 and forced him to take two terms' unpaid leave. He continued to contribute articles to many other publications, including book reviews and articles for New Society, the New Statesman, The Listener, The Spectator, the London Review of Books, The Observer, The Sunday Times, and The Guardian.

Publications
In his book on historiography, An Intelligent Person's Guide to History, Vincent observed that if we went solely by the documentary standards most prized by modern historians nothing would be more historically certain than the existence of actual witches in the Middle Ages, given the large volume of solemnly-sworn testimony available in original documents. In 1995, Oxford University Press refused at the last minute to publish the book, having commissioned and overseen much of its writing. A reader's report had described it as being "a sad and bitter diatribe" with a "general absence of the appreciation of the project of social history".  Peter Oborne later wrote that it is "one of the most brilliant works of British historiography since the war".

Death
Vincent died on 9 March 2021, aged 83.

Bibliography

Vincent, John, The Formation of the Liberal Party, 1857–68 (Constable, 1966; second edition, 1980).

References

1937 births
2021 deaths
Academics of the University of Bristol
British historians
Alumni of Christ's College, Cambridge
Fellows of Peterhouse, Cambridge
People educated at Bedales School